The Oakley THUMP are sunglasses that contain an MP3 player, in a 256 MB, 512 MB or 1 GB version. They were introduced in 2004. Prices for the THUMP PRO, introduced in Nov. 2007 range from $249 to $349.

Oakley THUMP 

The Oakley Thump is the first audio player built into sunglasses.  They feature flip up lenses for indoor use.  The first generation include the colors matte black, Rootbeer, Tortoise, and White Camo.  Color choices vary depending on whether you choose the 128MB or 256MB model; the latter has the bonus of polarized lenses.

Adding music to the Thump is done via the drag-and-drop method unless you use a program like Musicmatch or Windows Media Player, though no such software is included.  The Thump features a USB 2.0 interface.

The Thump is powered by a removable lithium-ion battery that recharges via the USB.  According to Oakley, the first gen THUMP battery is good for about 6 hours between charges.

The thump range uses two types of Li-ion battery the original battery was 120mAh which was later upgraded to a larger capacity 150mAh The Thump 2's were supplied with a slightly larger in size battery having the same 150mAh capacity. Oakley or Motorola does not offer any battery replacement or repair service for the Oakley Electronics range.

Oakley THUMP 2 

The Oakley Thump 2 offers UV and blue-light protection.  Thump 2 incorporates a flash-based player into the frame of a pair of sunglasses for cordless on-the-go listening.  Picking up where the original THUMP left off, quadrupling the memory for the same price as the original, 1GB for $299.  The Thump 2 also comes in other sizes: 256MB, available in brown with bronze and gunmetal, as well as black with grey and gunmetal; and 512MB, presented in black with black iridium and chrome, in addition to white with black iridium and chrome.  The Thump 2 earbuds use a multihinged system that lets you where you want.

It comes with no proprietary software. To transfer file to the thump, the user plugs it into your Windows or Mac OS computer with the included USB 2.0 cord, then drag over AAC, MP3, WMA, or WAV tracks. It works with WMA DRM content but not AAC DRM (songs from the iTunes Music Store).  Songs can be added to folders or as one long list.  The Thump will sort correctly tagged songs by artist during playback. The Thump remembers your place when listening and doesn't start each new session at the beginning of the song list.

The Thump 2's lenses don't flip up like the original Thump's, so you can't wear them over your prescription frames.

References
Forbes

Official Site
Sunglasses
Digital audio players